Manicouagan may refer to:
Manicouagan crater, an impact crater in Quebec
Manicouagan Reservoir, formed when the Manicouagan impact crater was converted to a reservoir.
Manicouagan Regional County Municipality, Quebec
Manicouagan River
Manicouagan (electoral district)
Manicouagan Uapishka Biosphere Reserve